Stygobromus indentatus, the Tidewater Stygonectid amphipod is a species of crustacean in family Crangonyctidae. It is native to Maryland, North Carolina and Virginia in the United States.  Its natural habitat is groundwater aquifers in the Tidewater region.

References

Freshwater crustaceans of North America
indentatus
Crustaceans described in 1967
Taxonomy articles created by Polbot
Taxobox binomials not recognized by IUCN